Maynaguri Government Polytechnic, is a government polytechnic located in Maynaguri, Jalpaiguri district, West Bengal.

About college
This polytechnic is affiliated to the West Bengal State Council of Technical Education,  and recognised by AICTE, New Delhi. This polytechnic offers diploma courses in Instrumentation and Control Engineering, Survey Engineering and Civil Engineering with 60 intake capacity of each stream.

See also

References

External links
Maynaguri Government Polytechnic
Official website WBSCTE

Universities and colleges in Jalpaiguri district
Educational institutions established in 2015
2015 establishments in West Bengal
Technical universities and colleges in West Bengal